45 Fremont Street is a 34-story,  office skyscraper in the Financial District of San Francisco, California between Market Street and Mission Street. Completed in 1978, the tower is often referenced as the Bechtel Building because of the spill over of offices from the Bechtel Corporation world headquarters next door at 50 Beale Street.

Major tenants
 Gensler
Wells Fargo Securities/ Investment Banking
 L.E.K. Consulting
 Birst
 ClearSlide
 KPFF Consulting Engineers

See also

 San Francisco's tallest buildings

References
https://web.archive.org/web/20161002220522/http://45fremontstreet.info/main.cfm?sid=introduction&pid=welcome

Financial District, San Francisco
Office buildings completed in 1978
Skyscraper office buildings in San Francisco
Skidmore, Owings & Merrill buildings
Leadership in Energy and Environmental Design gold certified buildings